Pierre-Paul-Etienne Alombert-Goget (January 17, 1888 – September 12, 1972) was a French Divisional general during the Interwar Period and Chief of Staff of the 1st Army during the Battle of France.

Biography 
Pierre was born in the 7th arrondissement of Paris, France, on January 17, 1888. He married Julia Marcelle Yvan on December 30, 1912.
He died on September 12, 1972, in Saint-Cyr-au-Mont-d'Or, and was buried the 14th of the same month, at the Loyasse Cemetery in Lyon.

References

External links 

 generals.dk
 gw.geneanet.org/alombert

1888 births
1972 deaths
Military personnel from Paris
Officiers of the Légion d'honneur
French Army generals of World War II